WREJ is a Black Gospel formatted broadcast radio station licensed to Richmond, Virginia, serving Richmond and Petersburg in Virginia. WREJ is owned by Jim Jacobs, through licensee Radio Richmond LLC.

WREJ also transmits through translator W267CB, a 250-watt transmitter licensed to Richmond.

References

External links
 Rejoice 990 Online

1951 establishments in Virginia
Gospel radio stations in the United States
Radio stations established in 1951
REJ